Chris Donovan may refer to:
 Chris Donovan (director)
 Chris Donovan (soccer)

See also
 Christopher G. Donovan , American politician